Patrick Regan may refer to:

Patrick M. Regan (born 1956), American professor at Binghamton University
Patrick Regan (Medal of Honor, 1918) (1882–1943), United States Army officer and World War I Medal of Honor recipient
Patrick Regan (Medal of Honor, 1873) (1852–?), United States Navy sailor and peacetime Medal of Honor recipient

See also 
Pat Regan (1955–2008), British anti-gun activist